William Edward Birkhimer (March 1, 1848 – June 10, 1914) was a United States Army brigadier general and lawyer received the Medal of Honor while a captain during the Philippine–American War. His career was long and varied, as he started as an Iowa private in the Union Army during the Civil War. He is buried in Arlington National Cemetery.

Career Dates
 March 21, 1864, Private, 4th Iowa Cavalry
 August 8, 1865, Mustered out of service
 September 1, 1866, Entered West Point as a cadet
 June 15, 1870 Commissioned second lieutenant from United States Military Academy, 3rd Artillery Regiment
 1873 Honor Graduate, Artillery School
 1874–1876 Assistant professor of natural & experimental philosophy
 April 10, 1879 promoted to first lieutenant
 1886–1890 Judge Advocate, Department of the Columbia
 February 10, 1898 promoted to captain
 1889 L.L.D. University of Oregon
 1899 Associate Justice Supreme Court of the Philippines (audencial) Manila, Philippines
 July 5, 1899, Colonel, 28th United States Volunteer Infantry
 May 1, 1901, mustered out of volunteers
 August 1, 1901 promoted to major, Artillery Corps
 May 20, 1905 promoted to lieutenant colonel, Artillery Corps
 February 15, 1906 promoted to brigadier general
 February 16, 1906 retired at own request

Birkhimer is the grandfather of Williston Birkhimer Palmer and Charles Day Palmer, brothers who became four-star generals.

Awards
 Medal of Honor
 Civil War Campaign Medal
 Indian Campaign Medal
 Spanish Campaign Medal
 Philippine Campaign Medal

Medal of Honor citation
Rank and Organization: Captain, 3d U.S. Artillery. Place and Date: At San Miguel de Mayumo, Luzon, Philippine Islands, May 13, 1899. Entered Service At: Iowa. Birth: Somerset, Ohio. Date of Issue: July 15, 1902.

Citation:

With 12 men charged and routed 300 of the enemy.

Books

See also

 List of Medal of Honor recipients
 List of Philippine–American War Medal of Honor recipients

References

External links
 

United States Army generals
Union Army soldiers
United States Military Academy alumni
1848 births
1914 deaths
United States Army Medal of Honor recipients
People from Somerset, Ohio
University of Oregon alumni
American military personnel of the Philippine–American War
People of Iowa in the American Civil War
Philippine–American War recipients of the Medal of Honor
Burials at Arlington National Cemetery
19th-century American lawyers